The 2002 Houston Cougars football team, also known as the Houston Cougars, Houston, or UH represented the University of Houston in the 2002 NCAA Division I-A football season.  It was the 57th year of season play for Houston. The team was coached by Dana Dimel, who was fired after the season.  The team played its home games at Robertson Stadium, a 32,000-person capacity stadium on-campus in Houston.

Schedule

Roster

Team players in the NFL

The following finished their college career in 2002, were not drafted, but played in the NFL.

References

Houston
Houston Cougars football seasons
Houston Cougars football